The red climbing mouse (Vernaya fulva), also known as Vernay's climbing mouse, is a species of rodent in the family Muridae. It is named after explorer and antiques dealer, Arthur Vernay, who sponsored the expedition during which the animal was first discovered. It is the only living species in the genus Vernaya, and has no subspecies.

Distribution
Red climbing mice found in southern China, in the provinces of Yunnan, Gansu, Sichuan, and Shaanxi and in northern Myanmar. Four extinct species of the genus Vernaya are also known, all discovered in Pleistocene deposits from southern China, alongside fossils of V. fulva.

Description
Only a few specimens of red climbing mice have been recorded by scientists. The fur has been described as soft and fluffy and merges from a brownish-orange colour along the middle of the black to a rich orange on the flanks, neck, shoulders, and the sides of the face. The underparts are pale buff in colour, while the ears are brown. The feet have orange fur on the upper surface, and paler beneath; all the toes have sharp claws, except for the first digit of the forepaws, which instead bear flattened nails.

Judging from the locations where specimens have been captured, the animal inhabits dense vegetation, such as low shrubbery and bracken.

References

Vernaya
Mammals described in 1927
Taxa named by Glover Morrill Allen
Taxonomy articles created by Polbot